Kebe Tame Naahan Kebe Mun Naahin is a 2012 Oriya film directed by Chakradhar Sahu starring Sabyasachi Mishra, Archita Sahu and Manoj Mishra. The film released on 17 February 2012.

Synopsis
Milly Choudhury lives with her parent Sashank and Sneha in Sambalpur. An influential goon Ruturaj Panda wants to marry Milly. Sashank accepts the marriage offer in fear. But Milly flees from house and reaches Bhubaneswar.  Swagat Das is an aspiring singer lives with his friend Pappu. When Swagat goes to railway station in Bhubaneswar to receive his friend's sister, receives Milly assuming her as his friend's sister in mistake. Milly suppresses her identity and lives with Swagat as Rekha. In the meantime, both Swagat and Milly falls love with each other.
One day when Swagat is out of town, Milly faces an accident and loses her memory. When her parent got her news from hospital take her away to their home. While returns to Bhubaneswar, Swagat doesn't find Milly, tries to search her whereabouts. Ruturaj again tries to force Milly to marry her. But anyhow Sawagat reached the spot. by seeing Swagat, Milly returns to normal. At last Swagat and Milly unites by punishing Ruturaj

Cast
 Sabyasachi Mishra as Swagat Das
 Archita Sahu as Rekha / Milli Choudhury
 Ajit Das as Sahank Choudhury
 Papu Pom Pom as Pappu (as Papu Pampam)
 Manoj Misra as Ruturaj Panda
 Bina Moharana as Sneha
 Akanksha as Roma
 Hadu as Haadu
 Salil Mitra as Film Director
 Jiban Panda as Hotel Receptionist
 Neelamani Sahu as Milan Kumar
 Tanya as an item number
 Siba Panda as Swaraj Behera

Filming
To give it a fresh look, the Movie was shot at beautiful locations of Kerala, Hyderabad and Odisha.

Soundtrack
The music for the movie was composed by Bikash Das.

Box office
The film fail to impress the young mass, to which the production house made targeted audience. The film did average business.

Awards
 4th Etv Oriya Film Awards 2013
 Best Lyricist – Mohit Chakraborty 
  23rd Orissa State Film Awards
 Best Lyricist – Arun Mantri
 Best Editor – Chakradhara Sahu

References

External links
 
  Official website

2012 films
2010s Odia-language films